The Best American Poetry 2004, a volume in The Best American Poetry series, was edited by general editor David Lehman. The guest editor for the year was Lyn Hejinian.

Hejinian, a "partisan of the Language School and the New York poets", according to Jacob Stockinger, editor of the culture desk at The Capital Times of Madison, Wisconsin, "seems to have gotten caught up in a poet-as-political activist or social commentator point of view [...] Perhaps that's why she even seems hostile to the notion of beauty, favoring relevance instead." Stockinger found much of the poetry in the volume, a "graduate school inscrutability without either meaning or music." Some of the pleasant surprises in the volume, for Stockinger, were "Here 2" by Bob Perelman and Jean Day's "Prose of the World Order".

Ron Smith, writer-in-residence at St. Christopher's School and director of its Writers Institute, wrote in the Richmond Times-Dispatch that the strong points of the collection are its "wit, humor and comedy". He added: "Ms. Hejinian's aesthetic is certainly an intellectual one, rather than an emotional one. The aim is not to move a reader, but to rev up his cognitive functions." Smith thought the volume's best poems were the contributions from Kim Addonizio, Craig Arnold, Billy Collins,  Carla Harryman, Jane Hirshfield, Danielle Pafunda, James Tate, Paul Violi, and David Wagoner.

Poets and poems included

See also
 2004 in poetry

Notes

External links
 Web page for contents of the book, with links to each publication where the poems originally appeared
 Best American Poetry Web site main page
  A review by Joan Houlihan in Boston Comment
  A review by David Orr in The New York Times Book Review.

Best American Poetry series
2004 poetry books
Poetry
American poetry anthologies